Swarangal Swapnangal (English translation: Voices And Dreams) is a 1981 Indian Malayalam film, directed by A. N. Thampi and produced by K. M. Thomas under the banner of Ramya Motion Picture Producers. The film stars M. G. Soman, Jayabharathi, Srividya, Shubha, Jose and Ambika in the lead roles. The film has musical score by G. Devarajan.

Cast
 
Jayabharathi as Indira
Srividya as Ramani
Jose as Ravi
Ambika as Latha
M. G. Soman as Prabhakaran
Sukumari as Teacher
Sankaradi as Janardhanan
Shubha as Usha
Alummoodan as Kunjiraman
K. P. A. C. Azeez as Stephen
Baby Ponnambili as Ambili
Baby Sangeetha as Anitha
Jagannatha Varma as Dr. Mohan
Kunchan as Thankamani
Lalithasree as Kalyani
Santhakumari as Rani

Soundtrack
The music was composed by G. Devarajan and the lyrics were written by A. P. Gopalan and Sreekantan Nair.

References

External links
  
 

1981 films
1980s Malayalam-language films